Cervello ("Brain") is a band from Italy.

History
Cervello was formed by musicians from Naples. Corrado Rustici, then 17 years old, was the younger brother of Danilo Rustici, who was the guitarist of another popular rock band from Naples of these years, the Osanna.

In 1973 the band released their sole album Melos, a brilliant Italian symphonic progressive rock production. The band show good mastery of their instruments, dazzling in sometimes over-complicated passages. Flutes and saxophones are often used to replace the keyboards and mellotron of many progressive works from this era.

In spite of critical praise the band broke up in 1974. Corrado Rustici, after a brief stint with the Osanna, and a lengthy tenure with Nova, started a successful career as a solo musician and producer. Gianluigi Di Franco collaborated with percussionist Tony Esposito in the early 1980s. He later dedicated himself to musicotherapy researches.

In 2017, three of the original members, Antonio Spagnolo, Giulio D’Ambrosio and Corrado Rustici performed a concert in Tokyo with new band members Virginio Simonelli (lead vocals), Sasà Priore (keyboards) and Davide De Vito (drums). This was released as a live CD and DVD Cervello - Live in Tokyo 2017.

Discography
Melos (1973)
Cervello - Live in Tokyo 2017 (2019)

See also
Progressive rock
Italian progressive rock
Il Balletto di Bronzo
Il Banco del Mutuo Soccorso
La Locanda delle Fate
Le Orme
Osanna
Nova
La Premiata Forneria Marconi
Il Rovescio della Medaglia

References

External links
Corrado Rustici's official site
Italian prog website
Review (In English)
Review (In Italian)

Italian progressive rock groups